Reunion in Vienna is a 1933 American pre-Code romantic drama produced and distributed by MGM. Sidney Franklin served as director. The film stars John Barrymore in a story taken from the 1931 stage play of the same name by Robert Emmet Sherwood.

Plot
An archduke who had been banished from Austria returns to Vienna for a reunion of his old fellow aristocrats and meets up with the former love of his life, who is now married to a psychoanalyst.

Cast
John Barrymore as Archduke Rudolf von Habsburg
Diana Wynyard as Elena Krug
Frank Morgan as Dr. Anton King
Henry Travers as Father Krug
May Robson as Frau Lucher
Eduardo Ciannelli as Pofferoff 
Una Merkel as Ilsa Hinrich
Bodil Rosing as Kathie (Krug family's maid)
Bela Loblov as Musician
Morris Nussbaum as Musician
Nella Walker as Countess Von Stainz
Hebert Evans as Count Von Stainz

Unbilled
Morris Ankrum as Bit Role
Symona Boniface as Noblewoman
John Davidson as Officer
George Davis as Waiter
Ferdinand Gottschalk as tour guide
Tenen Holtz as Tourist with Drapes
Alphonse Maartell as Nobleman
Torben Meyer as Headwaiter Strumpf
Edmund Mortimer as Tourist
Paul Porcasi as Chef
Lucien Prival as Colline, Waiter
Edward Reinach as Aristocrat
Tom Ricketts as Nobleman
Rolfe Sedan as Valet
Anders Van Haden as Aristocrat
Ellinor Vanderveer as Noblewoman
Dorothy Vernon as Tourist
William von Hardenburg as Aristocrat

Box office
The film grossed a total (domestic and foreign) of $643,000: $379,000 from the US and Canada and $264,000 elsewhere resulting in a loss of $134,000.
It received an Academy Award nomination for Best Cinematography.

References

External links
 

Reunion in Vienna; allmovie.com / synopsis

1933 films
American films based on plays
Films directed by Sidney Franklin
American romantic drama films
1933 romantic drama films
Metro-Goldwyn-Mayer films
Films set in Vienna
American black-and-white films
1930s American films